Mochammad Widi Syarief Hidayatullah (born 31 July 2003) is an Indonesian professional footballer who plays as an forward for Liga 1 club Persebaya Surabaya.

Club career

Persebaya Surabaya
He was signed for Persebaya Surabaya and played in Liga 1 in 2021 season. Widi made his first-team debut on 6 February 2022 in a match against Persipura Jayapura as a substitute for Ruy Arianto in the 46th minute at the Ngurah Rai Stadium, Denpasar.

International career
In October 2022, it was reported that Widi received a call-up from the Indonesia U-20 for a training camp, in Turkey and Spain.

Career statistics

Club

Notes

References

External links
 Widi Syarief at Soccerway
 Widi Syarief at Liga Indonesia

2003 births
Living people
Sportspeople from Surabaya
Sportspeople from East Java
Indonesian footballers
Persebaya Surabaya players
Liga 1 (Indonesia) players
Association football forwards